The Women's duet event at the 2018 Asian Games took place from 27 to 28 August 2018 at the Gelora Bung Karno Aquatic Stadium.

Schedule
All times are Western Indonesia Time (UTC+07:00)

Results
Legend
FR — Reserve in free
RR — Reserve in technical and free
TR — Reserve in technical

References

External links
Artistic swimming at the 2018 Asian Games
Artistic Swimming - Women's Duets | Asian Games 2018 Jakarta Palembang

Women's duet